Doug Robbins may refer to:

 Doug Robbins, founder of Robbinex, a consultative business intermediary firm
 Doug Robbins (baseball) (born 1966), former baseball catcher